Events from the year 1807 in Poland

Incumbents
 Monarch – Frederick Augustus I (from 9 June)

Events

 - Battle of Ostrołęka (1807)
 - Sejm of the Duchy of Warsaw
 - Duchy of Warsaw

Births

Deaths

 
 
 
 Zofia Dmuszewska actor and opera singer

References

 
Years of the 19th century in Poland